Nuzzo is an Italian surname. Notable people with the surname include:

John Ken Nuzzo (born 1966), Japanese-born Italian opera singer
Letizia Nuzzo (born 1976), Italian synchronized swimmer
Madre Teresa Nuzzo (1851–1923), Maltese Roman Catholic nun
Raffaele Nuzzo (born 1973), Italian footballer
Ralph Nuzzo (born 1954), American chemist
Regina Nuzzo, American statistician

Italian-language surnames